Gurpreet Singh Waraich (born 19 July 1971), commonly known as Gurpreet Ghuggi, is an Indian actor, comedian and politician. He is known for his works in Punjabi and Hindi films. Ghuggi began his career by acting in theatre in the early 1990s, after which he had recurring roles in television series such as Ronak Mela and the soap opera Parchhaven. He gained international public recognition with comedic leading roles through his videos Ghuggi Junction (2003) and Ghuggi Shoo Mantar (2004), before beginning his film career by starring as Patwari Jhilmil Singh in Asa Nu Maan Watna Da (2004). He starred in the film Carry On Jatta (2012), and was praised for his meaningful leading role in Ardaas (2015).

Personal life
Gurpreet Singh Waraich was born on 19 July 1971 in Gurdaspur in Punjab. He is married to Kuljeet Kaur with whom he has a son and a daughter. He is an eggetarian.

Acting career

Early career
Ghuggi's career began with his appearance in several theatrical plays. In the 1990s, he got his break on television when he was cast in the comedic series, Ronak Mela. After Ronak Mela, Ghuggi had lead roles on the soap opera Parchhaven, playing a serious character, as well as on several shows, including Ghuggi Express and Ghuggi On Line.

2004-present
Ghuggi's debut film role was in the romantic drama Jee Aayan Nu, in which he played a travel agency role. Released in 2002, the movie went direct-to-video. Soon after, he became a cast member of several films, including a breakthrough in 2015, when he was given the opportunity to play the lead role in Ardaas. His involvement in the film earned him the Filmfare Award for Best Actor (critics).

Alongside working in Punjabi cinema movies, Ghuggi has appeared in a few Bollywood and Canadian cinema films such as Singh Is Kinng and Breakaway. He received public recognition in India through his participation in The Great Indian Laughter Challenge, a reality show on STAR One. Later Ghuggi appeared with his wife, Kuljeet Kaur, on Star One's Hans Baliye and won the contest.

Ghuggi has appeared in live concerts such as Shounki Mela 2003 (along with Kamal Heer, Manmohan Waris and Sangtar), Vaisakhi Mela 2009 (along with Jazzy B and Sukhshinder Shinda) and Vaisakhi Mela 2010 (along with Nachatter Gill, Master Saleem and others).

In 2020, Ghuggi started a new talk show called Hasdeyaan De Ghar Vasde on Zee Punjabi and Zee5. Ghuggi hosts the show with Khushboo Grewal.

Political career
In 2014, Waraich joined the Aam Aadmi Party (AAP), a political party in India. From 4 September 2016 to 10 May 2017, he had led AAP Punjab as the party's state convener but was replaced by Bhagwant Maan. After his replacement, he quit the party. He had contested from the Batala Assembly Constituency during the 2017 Punjab Legislative Assembly election but lost, placing third behind Lakhbir Singh Lodhinangal and Ashwani Sekhri.

Discography

Videography

Filmography

Films

All films are in Punjabi, unless otherwise noted.

References

External links
 

Living people
Male actors in Hindi cinema
Male actors in Punjabi cinema
People from Jalandhar
Punjabi people
Male actors from Punjab, India
Indian male comedians
1971 births